Jeevika: Asia Livelihood Documentary Festival is an annual documentary festival started in January 2004 by Centre for Civil Society. The festival is a part of their Jeevika Campaign which advocates for livelihood freedom for street entrepreneurs. The festival showcases documentaries based on the issue of livelihood, to capture the challenges faced by the rural and urban poor by bringing them to the attention of the public.

Organiser 
Centre for Civil Society (CCS)  is an independent, non-profit, research and advocacy organisation and a public policy think tank. CCS's search for truth has taken everyday cases of harassment caused by legal and regulatory restrictions as well as bureaucratic process of approvals and licences. The films provoke, arouse curiosities and shake many accepted notions.

Organised by CCS, over the years, Jeevika has screened films advocating the cause of numerous small entrepreneurs, self-employed — rickshaw pullers, street vendors, sex-workers, child labourers, farmers — and forest-dwellers.

Manoj Mathew was instrumental in scaling the festival. He was Festival Director for the year 2008, 2009, 2010, 2011, 2012, 2013, 2015 editions.

Origin 
CCS initiated the festival as part of its aim to create policy change, to complement their research and advocacy work.

Jeevika Festival is structured on two categories- Professional film makers and student film makers. There is a two-tier evaluation process for the competition. The Screening Committee short-lists the top 15-20 films. The Jury selects the top three winners and the Best Student Film from the shortlisted films.

History

1st Jeevika: National Livelihood Documentary Festival 2003-04 
Jeevika 2003-04 was organized on January 17–18, 2004 at India Habitat Centre, New Delhi. Nine documentaries were screened at Jeevika 2003. The festival was inaugurated by film actress Nandita Das. The festival showcased documentary films on issues from struggles and aspirations of sex workers to Punjab farmers lured by money power taking the dangerous and illegal road to a better life abroad.

2nd Jeevika: National Livelihood Documentary Festival 2004-05 
Jeevika 2004-05 received 69 entries from students and professional filmmakers from all over India. 29 were student productions. 15 of these were screened at the India Habitat Center Festival in January 2005.Rahul Bose was inaugurated Jeevika 2004. 
Award ceremony was held on January 29, 2005 with inaugural address of Sanjaya Baru and award presentation by the chief guest Deepti Naval.Madhu Kishwar was also present to release the CCS Publication ‘Law, Liberty & Livelihood’. Jeevika 2004 was supported by Sir Ratan Tata Trust & John Templeton Foundation. Event partners were Red FM, The Indian Express, India Habitat Center.

3rd Jeevika: National Livelihood Documentary Festival 2005-06 
This was held at India Habitat Centre from January 21 to 28 2006 as well as at Kamala Nehru College. 85 entries were received from student and professional film-makers in various countries including India, Pakistan, Sri Lanka, Nepal, Bangladesh and Serbia of which 34 were student entries. The festival screened Lalitha Krishnan's ‘Sea City’, ‘Refugee of War’ by M.W. Geethani Senavirathna, ‘Pretty Dyana’ by Boris Mitic, ‘Treacling Down’ by Upali Gamlath and ‘Of Hawks and Hawkers’ by Shankar S. Shown on the second day were ‘A Page from the Red Data Book’ by Saurav Dey, ‘Life on Four Wheels’ by Anshuman Jha, ‘In Search of the Job’ by Mrinal Talukdar and ‘Lakshmi and Vishwakarma’ by Vasudha Joshi. The festival closed with the screening of "One Show Less" by Nayantara C. Kotian, which also won the first prize at the festival.

4th Jeevika: South Asia Livelihood Documentary Festival 2007 
In association with Youth Parliament, the festival was held from July 20–23, 2007 at the India Habitat Centre, Delhi. Screenings were also held across various colleges, institutes and schools across Delhi from July 23-August 23, for public viewing. Festival received 40 entries from students and 88 from professional filmmakers.

Smt. Shiela Dikshit (Former Chief Minister, New Delhi), Mr. P Chidamabram (Former Finance Minister, GOI), Mr. Ajay Maken (President Delhi Pradesh Congress Committee), Mr. Prashant Bhushan (Supreme Court Advocate, Social Activists), Ms. Renana Jhabvala (National Coordinator, SEWA Bharat), Mr. CR Jayasinghe (Sri Lankan High Commissioner) were among the chief guests.

5th Jeevika: South Asia Livelihood Documentary Festival 2008 
Festival was held from August 29 to August 31, 2008. Opening ceremony was dedicated to the cause of Tibetan refugees in the country. Neal Karthik's ‘Tribute to Life - memoir of a lost land.’ was screened as the opening film. The official representative of the Dalai Lama, Tempa Tsering, opened the film festival. Jury selected 17 entries out of 101 entries from Bangladesh, Pakistan, Nepal, United States, Iran and India for the screening.

6th Jeevika: Asia Livelihood Documentary Festival 2009 
175 entries were received from professional filmmakers and students. 11 documentaries were screened at the India Habitat Centre. Manoj Mathew, Director of the Festival, said, “The panel discussion which took place after the documentary screenings were the key-point of this festival. They encouraged people to think out of the box and break stereotypes. Through these discussions some plausible solutions to the problems also emerged.”  Shaji Pattanam's The Hunted - In search of Home and Hope, which won the 3rd prize highlighted the plight of tribes in Kerala, who were evicted from their natural habitat by corporate planters. One of the documentaries explored the unusual lives of the Neharwalas in Kolkata, who meticulously sweep drains in front of goldsmiths’ shops and try to distil gold from the dirt.

7th Jeevika: Asia Livelihood Documentary Festival 2010 
Jeevika: Asia Livelihood Documentary Festival, 27-29 August 2010 at Indian Habitat Centre, New Delhi. 21 entries were selected for the three-day screening. S M Khan, Director, Director General (Press Registrar and Head of Department) opened the festival. Nandan Saxena discussed on the topic “Representation of Reality in Documentary Making”. Mr. Sharad Yadav, MP Lok Sabha and Shabana Azmi, Indian actress and social activist were among the high-profile chief guests of the festival who also gave away the prizes.

8th Jeevika: Asia Livelihood Documentary Festival 2011 
In 2011 a total of 14 documentaries films were shortlisted from a total of 73 entries. On inaugural day noted filmmaker and Padma Vibhushan, Shri Adoor Gopalakrishnan declared the festival open and gave away the awards. Keynote Address was given by Ram Jethmalani, Lawyer and Member of Parliament.Shri Gopalakrishnan was quoted in the festival as: “I am really happy that Jeevika is giving a platform to aspiring filmmakers to show their talent, and not just that, they are also funding some of the films. One has to think about the logistics, no matter how much talent you have.”

9th Jeevika: Asia Livelihood Documentary Festival 2012 
Held from 31 August - 2 September 2012 at the India Habitat Centre. 18 documentary (13 professionals and 5 students) films were screened during the festival. The films were based various subjects such as Mumbai's night rat killers, life of primitive tribes, sex workers, seaweed collectors.  
Subhash Ghai was the chief guest of the event. He addressed the audience on the importance of reforming the education system in India to bring livelihood issues to the forefront of policy reform. The festival also conducted panel discussions on the issues of livelihood and documentary & public policy.

10th Jeevika: Asia Livelihood Documentary Festival 2013 
In 2013, the  festival received entries from across Asia including Singapore, China, Nepal, Malaysia, Indonesia and Bangladesh. 38 documentaries were shortlisted for screening which included long and short films by both professional  and students documentary makers 
CCS with the Delhi Photography Club hosted a photo exhibition and over 40 photographs will be showcased at the festival.
Prominent people who came to see the documentaries were Arundhati Roy, Mr. & Mrs. Veerappa Moily  who came to see documentary by their daughter Sushma Veerappa "When Shankar Nag Comes Asking."

Supported by (notable personalities)

Winners

Beyond Jeevika Festival
Jeevika on the road
Copies of the winning films are given to educational institutes and development organisations all across South Asia by CCS. 
http://www.ccs.in/jeevika/index.html

Bamboo Campaign
Bamboo, scientifically proven as grass, is often confused as tree or shrub or weed. Even according to India's legislation Bamboo is treated as tree and hence the protection laws are implied on it. As a result, the forest dependent communities are often restricted from using it. Although, Supreme Court has instituted laws like Scheduled Tribes and Other Traditional Forest Dwellers Act 2006 and has issued New Forest Policy 1988 to conserve forests and prevent their exploitation for commercial purposes, Bamboo is excluded from the provisions of the act.

CCS’ ‘Bamboo is not a tree’ campaign was a result of a documentary screened at the Jeevika Documentary Film Festival. They have conducted research on the issue and started online petition where they appeal to the Government of India to amend the Indian Forests Act (1927)  to classify Bamboo as grass. 
http://jeevika.org/research/bamboo/

References
http://www.merinews.com/article/jeevika-showcasing-challenges-in-livelihood/15874549.shtml

http://archive.digitalopportunity.org/article/view/151416

http://www.hindu.com/lf/2004/01/20/stories/2004012000210200.htm

http://www.hindu.com/mp/2009/09/03/stories/2009090351190100.htm

http://www.hindu.com/fr/2007/07/27/stories/2007072750250400.htm

http://www.ccs.in/jeevika/index.html

http://www.downtoearth.org.in/node/10802

http://www.hindu.com/lf/2004/01/20/stories/2004012000210200.htm

http://www.downtoearth.org.in/node/10802

http://www.thehindu.com/todays-paper/tp-national/tp-newdelhi/taking-cinema-seriously/article3239050.ece

http://webcache.googleusercontent.com/search?q=cache:http://archive.digitalopportunity.org/article/view/151416&strip=1

http://www.tribuneindia.com/2008/20080829/delhi.htm

http://www.thehindu.com/features/cinema/for-a-better-life/article13862.ece

http://jeevika.org/media/media-2010/

http://indiantheatre.blogspot.in/2010/08/harsh-manders-unsuni-script-mallika.html

http://www.groundreport.com/Media_and_Tech/JEEVIKA-Film-Fest-2011/2941047

http://www.thehindu.com/todays-paper/tp-national/tp-kerala/films-have-become-repetitive-adoor/article2405427.ece

http://southasia.oneworld.net/news-you-can-use/event/9th-jeevika-asia-livelihood-documentary-festival
 
http://www.eindiadiary.com/content/jeevika-documentary-film-festival-livelihood

https://web.archive.org/web/20140912020441/http://dearcinema.com/call-for-entry/call-for-entry-10th-jeevika-asia-livelihood-documentary-festival/0005

http://southasia.oneworld.net/news-you-can-use/event/10th-jeevika-asia-livelihood-documentary-festival-2013

http://www.ccs.in/jeevika/index.html

http://jeevika.org/research/bamboo/

http://jeevika.org/unintended-consequences/

http://swaminomics.org/livelihoods-the-man-in-the-street/

External links
 Jeevika

Documentary film festivals in India